Il branco is a 1994 Italian drama film directed by Marco Risi. The film, which is inspired by a 1983 rape case, entered the competition at the 51st Venice International Film Festival.

Cast 
Giampiero Lisarelli: Raniero
Luca Zingaretti: Ottorino
Ricky Memphis: Pallesecche
Giorgio Tirabassi: Sola
Natale Tulli: Sor Quinto
Tamara Simunovic: Sylvia
Angelika Krautzberger: Marion

References

External links

1994 films
Italian drama films
1994 drama films
Films directed by Marco Risi
Films about rape
1990s gang films
1990s Italian-language films
1990s Italian films